Głębokie may refer to the following places:

Poland
Głębokie, Gniezno County in Greater Poland Voivodeship (west-central Poland)
Głębokie, Koło County in Greater Poland Voivodeship (west-central Poland)
Głębokie, Kuyavian-Pomeranian Voivodeship (north-central Poland)
Głębokie, Lesser Poland Voivodeship (south Poland)
Głębokie, Łęczna County in Lublin Voivodeship (east Poland)
Głębokie, Lubartów County in Lublin Voivodeship (east Poland)
Głębokie, Krosno Odrzańskie County in Lubusz Voivodeship (west Poland)
Głębokie, Międzyrzecz County in Lubusz Voivodeship (west Poland)
Głębokie, Pomeranian Voivodeship (north Poland)
Głębokie, Subcarpathian Voivodeship (south-east Poland)
Głębokie, Drawsko County in West Pomeranian Voivodeship (north-west Poland)
Głębokie, Pyrzyce County in West Pomeranian Voivodeship (north-west Poland)
Głębokie, Szczecin, a neighbourhood in the city of Szczecin

Belarus
Hlybokaye (Polish: Głębokie), a town in Vitebsk Oblast, Belarus